Rebecca Daly (born 1980) is an Irish film director, screenwriter, and actress.

Early life
Daly was born in West Sussex and grew up in an Irish family in Haywards Heath. They later moved to Naas, Ireland. She studied theatre studies and English literature at Trinity College Dublin and completed an MA in film at Dublin Institute of Technology.

Career
Daly has written and directed three features and two shorts:
Joyriders (2006, short)
Hum (2010, short)
The Other Side of Sleep (2011)
Mammal (2016)
Good Favour (2017)

She won a Dublin Film Critics' Circle award for Best Director for Good Favour.

Personal life

Daly lives in Cork, Ireland. Her favourite films are Uncle Boonmee Who Can Recall His Past Lives, Lost in Translation and Under the Skin (2013).

References

External links
 

1980 births
Irish women film directors
Living people
People from Haywards Heath
People from Naas
Alumni of Trinity College Dublin
Alumni of Dublin Institute of Technology